"Fear of Flying" is the eleventh episode of the sixth season of the American animated television series The Simpsons. It was first broadcast on the Fox network in the United States on December 18, 1994. In the episode, the family attempts to go on a vacation but soon discovers that Marge is afraid of flying.

The episode was written by David Sacks and directed by Mark Kirkland. It features numerous guest stars, including Anne Bancroft as Dr. Zweig. Additionally, Ted Danson, Woody Harrelson, Rhea Perlman, John Ratzenberger, and George Wendt appear as their characters from Cheers.

It received a positive reception from television critics, and acquired a Nielsen rating of 9.6.

The authors of the book I Can't Believe It's a Bigger and Better Updated Unofficial Simpsons Guide commented positively on the episode, as did reviews from DVD Verdict and DVD Movie Guide.

Plot
At Moe's Tavern, the patrons pull a series of hazardous pranks on Moe. After pulling a harmless prank, Homer is disproportionately banned for life and must find another bar. He is asked to leave a refined cocktail bar, and rejects both a Cheers and a lesbian bar (owing to their karaoke nights and lack of fire exits, respectively). Homer eventually settles for an airline pilots' bar, where he is mistaken for a pilot and put in the cockpit of an airplane, despite his vehement protests, which he promptly wrecks. In exchange for his silence about its mistake, the airline gives the Simpson family free tickets to any of the lower forty-eight states.

The idea of plane travel fills Marge with anxiety because she has a fear of flying. After several failed attempts to avoid the trip, she has a panic attack on the plane, so the trip is postponed. To conquer Marge's phobia, Homer rents fiction films with airplane themes. This backfires when one film shows the survivors of a plane crash surviving by eating the dead crew and passengers.

When Marge shows signs of lingering flight-related trauma, manifesting as compulsions to perform household chores either at night or to an excessive degree, Lisa convinces her to undergo psychotherapy with Dr. Zweig. Homer is highly paranoid of this, believing that Dr. Zweig will identify him as a problem and convince Marge to leave him. She uncovers the roots of Marge's fear: the moment she realized her father was not a pilot, but a flight attendant. Her shame is eased when Zweig assures her that male flight attendants are now very common, and that her father could be considered a pioneer. Marge also remembers other flying-related accidents that caused her fear, which include getting accidentally hit in the eye with an "airplane" spoon by her grandmother as an infant, riding an airplane scooter that caught fire, and being taken to a cornfield where she and her mother were attacked by a plane.

Thinking she has finally conquered her fear of flying, Marge boards a plane with Homer. The plane skids off the runway and lands in a body of water.

Production

"Fear of Flying" was directed by Mark Kirkland, and written by David Sacks. The story of the episode came about when Sacks came into the writers' room with an idea for an episode where Marge goes to a therapist "for one reason or another". Sacks and the other writers then structured the rest of the plot around that storyline. Anne Bancroft was called in to voice Zweig. Before Bancroft recorded her part, the animators based Zweig's design on a temp track from cast member Tress MacNeille as the therapist. After Bancroft had recorded her part, Zweig was redesigned to fit with Bancroft's voice. They added split glasses and a streak of silver in her hair to give her a more mature look. Bancroft's husband Mel Brooks followed her to the studio, with Bancroft telling show runner David Mirkin "I can't get rid of him." Brooks, who also sat next to Mirkin when Bancroft played her role and also sought to advise Mirkin, would go on to guest star the same season in "Homer vs. Patty and Selma."

The staff were able to get the central cast of the American sitcom Cheers, with the exception of Kelsey Grammer, to reunite and guest star in the episode. The staff could not arrange the script to allow time in the episode for Grammer, who already had a recurring role on The Simpsons as Sideshow Bob, to voice Frasier Crane (although the character does have a non speaking cameo in the episode). Ted Danson guest starred as Sam, Woody Harrelson as Woody, Rhea Perlman as Carla, John Ratzenberger as Cliff, and George Wendt as Norm.

Due to the episode running short in length, it features the long title sequence which ends with various characters performing a dance routine for the couch gag.

Cultural references
Homer enters the Cheers bar in a scene, which is a parody of a typical episode of the comedy series Cheers. All of the speaking characters are voiced by the actors who played them in Cheers. Ironically, Frasier Crane remains silent despite being played by The Simpsons veteran Kelsey Grammer, the voice of Sideshow Bob. Marge's dream sees her in the role of Maureen Robinson from Lost in Space, while Homer plays Dr. Zachary Smith and Lisa plays the Robot. The scene where Marge and Jacqueline Bouvier run away when a biplane shoots at them in a cornfield is a parody of Alfred Hitchcock's film North by Northwest.

Homer's Mount Lushmore caricature resembles Eustace Tilley, the mascot of The New Yorker. Homer's line about getting out of Springfield is lifted from It's a Wonderful Life, while Homer's all-time favorite song is revealed to be "It's Raining Men" by The Weather Girls. Marge referring to Dr. Zweig as "Lowenstein" is a reference to the 1991 film The Prince of Tides.

Reception

Critical reception
Since airing, the episode has received many positive reviews from fans and television critics.

In July 2007, Simon Crerar of The Times listed the Cheers cast's performance as one of the thirty-three funniest cameos in the history of the show.

Warren Martyn and Adrian Wood, the authors of the book I Can't Believe It's a Bigger and Better Updated Unofficial Simpsons Guide, said it was "a good Marge-centric episode with plenty of clever set pieces – the tributes to Cheers and Lost in Space are fantastic", and noted that "Marge's father looks suspiciously like Moe".

Ryan Keefer at DVD Verdict said that "with the cast of Cheers appearing (except for Grammer, ironically) and a funny spoof of North by Northwest, the episode is much better than you would expect", and gave it a B+.

Colin Jacobson at DVD Movie Guide said in a review of the sixth season DVD that it was "another show I didn’t recall fondly but that works exceedingly well. I hadn’t realized how many quotes I’ve stolen from this one: the name 'Guy Incognito', the dog with the puffy tail, 'a burden coupled with a hassle'. The show makes little sense in regard to continuity since Marge has flown during prior shows, but it’s consistently very funny and entertaining."

The Phoenix named Anne Bancroft one of the twenty best guest stars to appear on the show.

Ratings
In its original broadcast, "Fear of Flying" finished 48th (tied with Dateline NBC) in the ratings for the week of December 12 to December 18, 1994, with a Nielsen rating of 9.6. The episode was the third highest rated show on the Fox network that week, beaten only by Beverly Hills, 90210, and Married... with Children.

Merchandise
The episode was selected for release in a 1999 video collection of selected episodes titled: The Simpsons Go To Hollywood. Other episodes included in the collection set were "Flaming Moe's", "Krusty Gets Kancelled", and "Homer to the Max". "Fear of Flying" was again included in the 2003 DVD release of the same set. It was included in The Simpsons season 6 DVD set, which was released on August 16, 2005, as The Simpsons – The Complete Sixth Season.

References

External links

The Simpsons (season 6) episodes
1994 American television episodes
Cheers
Psychotherapy in fiction
Crossover television
Crossover animation